The Sangamon Mass Transit District (SMTD) is a regional mass transit district that mostly serves Springfield, Illinois along with a few neighboring communities. It is governed by a seven-member board of trustees, who are all appointed by the Sangamon County Board of Supervisors.

Routes 

The Sangamon Mass Transit District operates 17 regular routes during the day, 5 routes at night, 4 limited-service suburban routes and 9 supplemental routes which serve schools. On weekdays between 6 a.m. and 5:30 p.m., most routes run every half-hour. Eleven of the day routes begin at the downtown transfer center, at 11th and Washington Streets, with buses leaving downtown at the top and bottom of the hour. Five routes begin at a secondary transfer center on Junction Circle, on the southwest side, where most of the area's growth and new development has taken place in recent decades. These routes leave Junction Circle at 15 and 45 minutes past the hour. One special route carries passengers between both locations. The limited-service suburban routes make two trips per weekday, at rush hours, between Springfield and some nearby towns. On weeknights between 6 and 10 p.m., buses leave downtown once an hour, at the top of the hour. The last buses of the night return to downtown at 11 p.m. Supplemental routes run only once per day. No service is offered on Sundays, nor on New Year's Day, Memorial Day, Independence Day, Labor Day, Thanksgiving, or Christmas.

Daytime routes
Route 0    Transfer Center Express – Downtown to Junction Circle
Route 1    Downtown to North 5th St. / Sand Hill Rd. - serves Illinois State Fairgrounds
Route 2    Downtown to North 9th St. / Piper Rd. / Northgate subdivision
Route 3    Downtown to Clear Lake Ave. / Midwest Technical Institute / Grandview
Route 4    Downtown to West Lawrence Ave. / West Jefferson St.
Route 5    Downtown to Memorial Medical Center / St. John's Hospital / North Grand Ave.
Route 6    Junction Circle to Clear Lake Ave.
Route 7    Downtown to West Washington St. / White Oaks Mall
Route 8    Downtown to South Grand Ave. / South MacArthur Blvd. - serves Leland Grove and Jerome
Route 9    Downtown to Martin Luther King Dr. / East Cook St.
Route 10   Downtown to South 11th St. / Stevenson Dr. - serves the Laketown neighborhood
Route 11   Downtown to University of Illinois Springfield and Lincoln Land Community College
Route 12   Downtown to South 6th St. / Southern View / Memorial Medical Center and St. John's Hospital
Route 13   Junction Circle to White Oaks Mall and other shopping centers on the southwest side
Route 14   Junction Circle to Southern View and Toronto Rd.
Route 15   Junction Circle to University of Illinois Springfield via Southern View
Route 16   Junction Circle to West Wabash Ave.

Limited-service suburban routes
 Route 410   Chatham
 Route 420   Rochester
 Route 430   Sherman
 Route 440   Spaulding and Riverton

Evening Routes
Route 901 North Side
Route 902 Southeast Side
Route 903 West Side via West Washington
Route 905 UIS / LLCC
Route 15 UIS to Chatham Hills

Supplemental routes
Route 202 Ash and Greentree to Laketown/Southern View
Route 204 Lewis and Adams to downtown
Route 208 11th and North Grand to downtown
Route 210 Lewis and Adams to Amos / Golf / Brentwood
Route 212 Ash and Greentree to downtown
Route 214 11th and North Grand to Bruns Lane
Route 215 Laketown/Southern View to Ash and Greentree
Route 217 Clearlake to 11th and North Grand
Route 220 Lewis and Adams to East Cook / Martin Luther King Jr. Drive

Cash fare, transfers and passes 
Regular bus fare is $1.25 for anyone age five or over. Fare for the suburban routes is $1 if boarding outside Springfield. Up to two children under the age of four are permitted on the buses free of charge with an adult.  More than two children under this age will cost an additional 60 cents.  For senior citizens, disabled persons, or Medicare card holders, fare is 60 cents with proof of such status.  Senior citizens and disabled persons enrolled in the Benefit Access program can procure a photo ID that enables them to ride without paying a fare. Transfers between connecting buses are free and available upon request of the driver when fare is initially paid.

Bus passes are available at area businesses including all Walgreens stores in the city, public, private, and parochial schools, Lincoln Library, and the SMTD home office at 928 S. 9th Street.

Three different kinds of passes are available, and are color-coded for easy identification.

Regular Discount Pass (Yellow) 20 Rides/$20.00
Senior Citizen Pass   (Peach)  20 Rides/$12.00
Disabled Person Pass  (Blue)   20 Rides/$12.00

Buses 

The routes are covered with 53 buses (15 fueled with Compressed natural gas, 34 fueled with diesel) and 22 paratransit vans. All buses are equipped with bike racks.
As of July 1, 2018, the buses are
Four 2008 Gillig (Diesel) buses
Ten 2011 Gillig (Diesel) buses
Five 2013 Gillig (Diesel) 30' buses
Seven 2013 New Flyer Industries Compressed natural gas buses
Seven 2014 Gillig (Diesel) buses
Two 2017 New Flyer Industries (Diesel) buses
Eight 2018 New Flyer Industries Compressed natural gas buses
Nine 2018 New Flyer Industries (Diesel) buses

Paratransit 

The SMTD operates a paratransit service named Access Sangamon for disabled people who are unable to use the regular buses. Service is available at the same times that the regular buses are operating.

Funding and employees 

In 2017, the employee headcount was 143, of whom 116 were members of labor unions and 27 were administrative personnel.  The annual budget was $7.2 million.

Only 9% of the SMTD's 2017 operating budget was met through fares paid by riders.  An additional 1% was earned through other private-sector-style income streams, such as income from placards and billboards on the buses, and the remaining 90% consisted of federal, state, and local public-sector subsidies.

Recent developments 

On January 1, 2017, SMTD changed its operating name from Springfield Mass Transit District to Sangamon Mass Transit District. The limited-service suburban routes were added on September 17, 2018.

In 2019, the city opened a new transfer center on the east edge of downtown, and at the same time, completely overhauled its routes. The redesigned routes cover a larger geographical area than before, bringing service with reach of up to 10,000 additional area residents. Construction of the Springfield-Sangamon Transportation Center at the downtown transfer center began in 2021, and improvements are under construction to an adjacent railroad. When complete, the new facility is expected to become part of the Chicago Hub Network, Illinois' new high-speed rail system, with stops by trains and possibly intercity buses. Presently, Amtrak trains run on another railroad about half a mile west of the new transfer center.

Fixed Route Ridership

The ridership statistics shown here are of fixed route services only and do not include demand response.

References

External links 

 Sangamon Mass Transit District homepage

Bus transportation in Illinois
Districts of Illinois
Springfield, Illinois
Transit agencies in Illinois